José Ignacio Salafranca Sánchez-Neyra (born 31 May 1955) is a Spanish politician and diplomat who currently serves as a Member of the European Parliament integrated within the European People's Party political group. He was previously the Head of the EU Delegation to Argentina between 2015 and 2017.

Studies
José Ignacio Salafranca has a bachelor's degree in law, PHD law courses at the Complutense University of Madrid and Diplomate in European integration by the Diplomatic School of Madrid and the National Institute of Public Administration. He also is Honorary Doctorate by Las Américas University of Chile

Political career

Member of the European Parliament, 1994–2014

Sánchez-Neyra has been a Member of the European Parliament since the 1994 European elections. In Parliament, he sat on the Committee on Foreign Affairs. He was a substitute for the Committee on Constitutional Affairs, substitute for the Delegation to the EU-Mexico Joint Parliamentary Committee. From 2006 and 2007, Salafranca was a member of the Parliament's Temporary Committee on the alleged use of European countries by the CIA for the transport and illegal detention of prisoners.

On the Committee on Foreign Affairs, Salafranca Sánchez-Neyra served as the European Parliament's rapporteur on the bi-regional strategic association between the EU and Latin America and the association, political dialogue and cooperation agreements between the European Community and Mexico, Chile and the Andean Community.

In addition to his committee assignments, Salafranca Sánchez-Neyra was a member of the European People's Party Group Bureau. Between 2001 and 2004, he also served as Vice-Chairman of the Group.

Other roles:
 2001-2004: Member of the EPP Group Policy Bureau
 EPP-ED Group coordinator on the Committee on Foreign Affairs
 Former Chairman of the Delegation for relations with the countries of South America and the Delegation for relations with the countries of Central America, Mexico and Cuba
 2001: European Parliament representative at the Second Summit of Heads of State and Government of the EU, Latin America and the Caribbean (Madrid, 2002) and at the Third Summit of Heads of State and Government of the EU, Latin America and the Caribbean (Guadalajara, Mexico, 2004), and head of the parliamentary delegation to the 12th, 13th and 14th San Jose Ministerial Conferences with the Rio Group (2000, 2001) and the Euro-Mediterranean partnership

Salafranca Sánchez-Neyra chaired the Parliament's observer mission for the 2000 general elections in Peru, the 2002 presidential elections in Colombia., in Afghanistan in 2005, in El Salvador in 2009 and Paraguay in 2013.

Extraordinary and Plenipotentiary Ambassador and Head of the EU Delegation to Argentina, 2015–2017
On 31 August 2015, Federica Mogherini, High Representative of the European Union for Foreign Affairs and Security Policy, appointed Salafranca Sánchez-Neyra as Head of the EU Delegation to Argentina.

Member of the European Parliament, 2017–present
Salafranca Sánchez-Neyra has again been serving as Member of the European Parliament since 3 January 2017. He is currently a member of the Committee on Foreign Affairs where he is Vice-Coordinator of the EPP group and Standing Rapporteur of the UE-Mexico agreement and the Instrument for Pre-accession Assistance (IPA III) , Committee on International Trade Standing Rapporteur of the UE-MERCOSUR trade agreement, Committee on Budgetary Control Standing Rapporteur of the  EU Anti-Fraud Programme  and the Special committee on financial crimes, tax evasion and tax avoidance.

In 2018 he was the President of the European Parliament Delegation to the Electoral Observation Missions in Paraguay and Lebanon.

Political activities
In 2006, Salafranca Sánchez-Neyra was the chief of a committee of 70 electoral observers from the European Union for the Mexican general election. After the election Salafranca Sánchez-Neyra considered the controversial election clean and considered the decision of the Electoral Tribunal as fair. Mark Almond, an election observer questioned the objectivity of José Ignacio Salafranca and some of the mass media.

In May 2015, news media reported that Salafranca Sánchez-Neyra was included in a Russian blacklist of prominent people from the European Union who are not allowed to enter the country.

On 18 February 2019, together with MEPs Esteban González Pons and Gabriel Mato Adrover, claimed that they were expelled from Venezuela as they wanted to visit Juan Guaidó.

References

External links

 
 

1955 births
Living people
Complutense University of Madrid alumni
MEPs for Spain 1999–2004
MEPs for Spain 2004–2009
MEPs for Spain 2009–2014
MEPs for Spain 2014–2019
People's Party (Spain) MEPs